The Barada spring minnow (Pseudophoxinus syriacus) is a species of ray-finned fish in the family Cyprinidae. It may be extinct.
It is found in Lebanon and Syria.

References

Pseudophoxinus
Taxa named by Louis Charles Émile Lortet
Fish described in 1883
Taxonomy articles created by Polbot